Richard Dixon (born 28 March 1992) is a Panamanian professional footballer who plays as a centre-back for Plaza Amador.

Club career

Chorrillo
He joined Chorrillo from Sporting San Miguelito in January 2014.

Limón
In 2016, Dixon signed with Limón of Costa Rica.

Águila
Dixon signed with Águila of the Salvadoran Primera División for Apertura 2017 tournament. With the team of San Miguel, Dixon experienced a serious salary delay, which was solved at the end of the tournament.

International career
Dixon made his debut for Panama in a November 2012 friendly match against Spain and has, as of 10 June 2015, earned a total of 5 caps, scoring no goals. He represented his country at the 2013 CONCACAF Gold Cup.

References

External links
 
 

1992 births
Living people
Association football defenders
Panamanian footballers
Panama international footballers
2013 Copa Centroamericana players
2013 CONCACAF Gold Cup players
Sporting San Miguelito players
Unión Deportivo Universitario players
C.D. Plaza Amador players
Liga Nacional de Fútbol Profesional de Honduras players
Platense F.C. players
Footballers at the 2015 Pan American Games
Pan American Games competitors for Panama